U.S. Route 20 (US 20) is an east-west U.S. Highway in Pennsylvania, which clips the northwestern corner of the state, running entirely in Erie County. While it is part of the nation's longest road, it features the shortest segment of any two-digit U.S. route in the commonwealth. Although bypassed by Interstate 90 (I-90) as the primary through route in the area, heavy traffic has led to nearly the entire highway being upgraded to four lanes in width.

Route description

US 20 travels for 45 miles through Pennsylvania's Great Lakes region. For most of its journey, it closely parallels a heavily travelled CSX rail line, which also serves Amtrak passenger trains. The highway enters the state under the moniker of West Ridge Road eastward from the Ohio border, as it journeys through Springfield Township, Girard Township, Fairview Township and Millcreek Township. This section of road was widened to encompass a mostly four-lane set-up after a pair of 1938 and 1946 infrastructural projects, owing to the heavy truck traffic between Erie and Cleveland, Ohio. A 1952 upgrade saw the remainder of the Millcreek Township section of the route improved to four lanes. 

At the intersection with PA 832, just outside the Erie city limits, US 20 becomes West 26th Street. The highway then passes through an industrial and commercial corridor that represents a 1946 alignment change, which saw 26th Street extended to avoid the route's former complicated passage along East Avenue. Soon after a major interchange with Greengarden Boulevard, the highway becomes two lanes, as it passes through Erie's old residential neighborhoods.  After a junction with US 19 just south of the city center, it becomes East 26th Street. 

US 20 turns sharply northward as Broad Street at the Bayfront Connector, as it resumes four lane status temporarily. It then turns east again as Buffalo Road through Wesleyville and Harborcreek Township. This portion of road was upgraded to four lanes during a 1958 overhaul. In North East Township, US 20 becomes West Main Road. Within the town limits of North East it becomes West Main Street until it reaches the town center at its intersection with PA 89, where it becomes East Main Street. Outside the town limits it becomes East Main Road until it reaches Pennsylvania's border with New York. The portion of road around North East was upgraded to four lanes in 1971.

Major intersections

See also

References

External links

Pennsylvania Highways: US 20
US 20 at AARoads.com
Pennsylvania Roads – US 20

 Pennsylvania
20
Transportation in Erie County, Pennsylvania